"Impossible" is a song recorded by Swedish singer Måns Zelmerlöw. It was released on 16 November 2009 as a digital download in Sweden. It was released as the third single from his second studio album MZW (2009). The song was written by Aleena Gibson, Måns Zelmerlöw and Dan Sandquist. It peaked at number 48 on the Swedish Singles Chart.

Track listing

Chart performance

Weekly charts

Release history

References

2009 songs
Måns Zelmerlöw songs
Songs written by Måns Zelmerlöw
Warner Music Group singles
English-language Swedish songs